Beyond the Rio Grande is a 1930 American pre-Code western film directed by Harry S. Webb and starring Jack Perrin, Franklyn Farnum and Jay Wilsey.

Cast
 Jack Perrin as 	Bert Allen
 Franklyn Farnum as 	Joe Kemp
 Charline Burt as 	Betty Burke
 Emma Tansey as Mrs. Burke
 Jay Wilsey as 	Bill
 Pete Morrison as Al Mooney
 Henry Roquemore as 	Sheriff
 Edmund Cobb as 	Dick
 Henry Taylor as 	Doctor
 Barney Beasley as 	Henchman 
 Herman Hack as Henchman 
 Artie Ortego as Vaquero
 Starlight the Horse as Starlight, Bert's Horse

References

Bibliography
 Munden, Kenneth White. The American Film Institute Catalog of Motion Pictures Produced in the United States, Part 1. University of California Press, 1997.
 Pitts, Michael R. Poverty Row Studios, 1929–1940. McFarland & Company, 2005.

External links
 

1930 films
1930 Western (genre) films
1930s English-language films
American Western (genre) films
Films directed by Harry S. Webb
American black-and-white films
1930s American films